Binibining Pilipinas 1995 was the 32nd edition of Binibining Pilipinas. It took place at the Araneta Coliseum in Quezon City, Metro Manila, Philippines on March 12, 1995.

At the end of the event, Charlene Gonzales crowned Joanne Santos as Binibining Pilipinas Universe 1995, Caroline Subijano crowned Reham Snow Tago as Binibining Pilipinas World 1995, and Alma Concepcion crowned Gladys Dueñas as Binibining Pilipinas International 1995. Caroline Pobre was named First Runner-Up, and Margaret Laing was named Second Runner-Up.

Results
 
Color keys
  The contestant was a Semi-Finalist in an International pageant.
  The contestant did not place.

Special Awards

Contestants 
39 contestants competed for the three titles:

Notes

Post-pageant Notes 

 Joanne Santos did not place in Miss Universe 1995 in Windhoek, Namibia. However, she was appointed to represent the Philippines in Miss Tourism International 1997 and won.
 Reham Snow Tago did not place in Miss World 1995 in Sun City, South Africa. On the other hand, Gladys Dueñas was chosen as one of the 15 semifinalists in Miss International 1995 in Tokyo, Japan.
 Jewel May Lobaton competed again at Binibining Pilipinas 1998, and was awarded as First Runner-Up. Later, Tisha Silang resigned as Binibining Pilipinas-Universe 1998 due to citizenship issues and was replaced by Lobaton. Lobaton competed in Miss Universe 1998 in Honolulu, Hawaii but was unplaced. Nena Ann dela Peña also competed at Binibining Pilipinas 1998, but was unplaced.
 Esabela Cabrera competed in Mutya ng Pilipinas 1997 and was crowned as Mutya ng Pilipinas-Asia Pacific 1997. Later that year, Cabrera was asked to resign due to speculations that she is married and is also pregnant. She competed again at Binibining Pilipinas 1998 and was one of the semifinalists until she was appointed as Second Runner-Up after Elsie Sicat, the Second Runner-Up, assumed the First Runner-Up position that was previously awarded to Jewel May Lobaton.

References 

1995